Alan Tongue (born 13 October 1980) is an Australian former professional rugby league footballer who played in the 2000s and 2010s. A Country New South Wales representative forward,  he captained the Canberra Raiders for several seasons in the NRL.

Background
Tongue was born in Tamworth, New South Wales, Australia.

Early years
While attending Farrer Memorial Agricultural High School in 1998, Tongue was selected to play for his country in the Australian Schoolboys team.

Playing career
Tongue is a 10-year veteran at Canberra, making his debut in 2000 and winning the Raiders' Rookie of the Year award after joining the club in 1998. He spent the majority of his early years moving between the backrow and the interchange bench. He established his position within the side in 2005, and in 2006 Tongue broke the record for most tackles in the regular season with 1,087. The next highest ranking player was Nathan Hindmarsh with 911. Tongue was also voted the Raider's Player of the Year in 2006.

At the end of the 2008 NRL regular season, Tongue was awarded Dally M recognition for Lock of the Year and Captain of the Year after leading the Raiders to 6th on the competition ladder. Tongue was also named in the Prime Minister's XIII at the end of 2008.

Tongue was selected in the City vs Country match on 8 May 2009. In this game he scored a rare try in a 40–18 defeat.

In his 200th game for Canberra, on 28 August 2010, a Tongue supporter commented on the opposition (North Queensland Cowboys, through its player Willie Mason) in a sexually suggestive crowd poster shown prominently at the stadium and in TV coverage: "Who needs a Big Willie when you have a great Tongue?". In this game, Tongue returned to the side, and suffered another injury, in a 48-4 high scoring win over the Cowboys at Canberra Stadium that had the Raiders join the top 8 teams in the competition and join the finals rounds for the 2010 competition.

Tongue announced his retirement on 17 August 2011.

Post-playing career

Tongue is an Australian Apprenticeships Ambassador for the Australian Government and an Apprentice Mentor in the NRL's Trading Up program. As an NRL Ambassador, since 2017 he has conducted workshops as part of the NRL's Voice Against Violence program.

Tongue was named ACT Australian of the Year in 2017.

References

External links

https://web.archive.org/web/20120323005002/http://www.raiders.com.au/default.aspx?s=article-display&id=42046&title=update-tongue-to-retire-at-end-of-2011
https://web.archive.org/web/20120323005016/http://www.raiders.com.au/default.aspx?s=article-display&id=42049
Alan Tongue at the Rugby League Project
Canberra Raiders profile
http://www.foxsports.com.au/league/player?id=100076&name=alan-tongue&team=55004

 

1980 births
Living people
Australian rugby league players
Canberra Raiders captains
Canberra Raiders players
Country New South Wales Origin rugby league team players
People from Tamworth, New South Wales
Prime Minister's XIII players
Rugby league locks
Rugby league hookers
Rugby league players from New South Wales